Jan Kustos (5 September 1893 in Syrynia, Wodzisław Śląski – 28 July 1932 in Katowice) was a Silesian politician, philosophy magister, press editor, founder and chairman of the Union of Upper Silesians Defence from 1925-1932, spokesman rights national minority for Silesians in Poland, member of town council in Katowice in the period 1926-1927, founder of the Trade Union of Upper Silesians in 1927, and a representative of Silesian nationality in the time of conversation with representative League of Nations in 1929.

See also
 Union of Upper Silesians
 Ewald Latacz
 Joseph Musiol
 Silesian People's Party
 Józef Kożdoń
 Theofil Kupka
 Silesian Autonomy Movement

References

Sources
 Piotr Dobrowolski, Ugrupowania i kierunki separatystyczne na  Górnym Śląsku i w Cieszyńskiem w latach 1918-1939, Warszawa – Kraków 1972.
 Dariusz Jerczyński, Historia Narodu Śląskiego. (History of Silesian Nation), second edition (implemented and corrected), Zabrze 2006.
 Guido Hitze, Carl Ulitzka (1873-1953) oder Oberschlesien zwischen den Weltkriegen, Düsseldorf 2002.

People from Katowice
Silesian politicians
1893 births
1932 deaths
People from the Province of Silesia